Stephen Baidoo (born 25 February 1976, in Sekondi-Takoradi) is a Ghanaian former football player who last played for King Faisal Babes. He previously played domestically for Great Eagles of Tamale and Goldfields Obuasi and in Turkey for MKE Ankaragücü and Samsunspor.

International 
Baidoo was part of the Ghanaian 2000 African Nations Cup team, who exited in the quarter-finals after losing to South Africa. He was also a member of the Ghanaian squad at the 1996 Summer Olympics.

References

External links

Player Profile : Stephen Baidoo
Retired Footballers FC beat Sports Presenters FC

1976 births
Living people
Ghanaian footballers
Ghana under-20 international footballers
Ghana international footballers
Footballers at the 1996 Summer Olympics
Olympic footballers of Ghana
MKE Ankaragücü footballers
Samsunspor footballers
Süper Lig players
Expatriate footballers in Turkey
King Faisal Babes FC players
Ashanti Gold SC players
1996 African Cup of Nations players
2000 African Cup of Nations players
Ghanaian expatriate sportspeople in Turkey
Ghanaian expatriate footballers
Association football midfielders